Homer Garner Barnett (1906 in Bisbee, Arizona – May 9, 1985) was an American anthropologist and teacher.

Education 

He began his studies at Stanford in civil engineering but soon quit to rethink his major.  When he returned to Stanford it was as a liberal arts major with an emphasis on philosophy.  He graduated in 1927.  He later attended the University of California, Berkeley for his Ph.D., granted in 1938.  His specialization was culture change and applied anthropology.

As a student, Barnett did field work among the American Indians of Oregon, Washington, and northwestern California, particularly the Yurok, Hupa, Yakima, and several small groups of the Oregon coast. Some research concerned diverse ethnological matters but focused primarily on the Indian Shaker religion and the potlatch. The latter was the subject of his doctoral dissertation.

Teaching 

In 1939 after receiving his Ph.D. he began working at the University of New Mexico as the field director of the Jemez Archeological Field School.  Soon after this position ended he moved on to the University of Oregon.  Here he became the second member of the Anthropology department, along with Luther Cressman.  After serving for a few years during World War II, Barnett returned to the University of Oregon and continued to study Pacific cultures.

From 1947 to 1948, Barnett conducted field research on the indigenous people of Palau.

Barnett continued to study American Indians in California and the Pacific Northwest and displaced communities in the Pacific.  He served as a visiting lecturer for the American Anthropological Association from 1960 until 1961.  He spoke at college campuses that did not have anthropology departments, trying to spread his knowledge of anthropology.
Barnett became an emeritus professor at the University of Oregon in 1971 and officially retired in 1974. After his retirement Barnett worked on writings and publications up until the time of his death May 9, 1985.

World War II 

During World War II he stopped teaching to participate in the Far Eastern Language and Area Training Program of the University of California at Berkeley.  Here he trained volunteer service men to effectively gain information from native informants to help the war effort.  In 1944 he began working with the Ethnogeographic Board to provide scientific information about human and natural resources of world areas. He later began working with the War Document Survey in the Pacific to give advice about documents that the U.S. government was acquiring from other governments during the war.

Select bibliography 
 Culture element distributions. VII: Oregon coast, 1937
 Gulf of Georgia Salish, 1939
 Innovation: the basis of cultural change, 1953
 The Coast Salish of British Columbia, 1955
 Anthropology in administration, 1956
 Indian Shakers; a messianic cult of the Pacific Northwest, 1957
 Peace and progress in New Guinea, 1959
 Being a Palauan, 1959
 Palauan society, a study of contemporary native life in the Palau Islands, 1959
 Application to the National Science Foundation for research funds in support of a project entitled a comparative study of cultural change and stability in displaced communities, 1962
 The nature and function of the potlatch, 1968
 The Yakima Indians in 1942, 1969
 Qualitative science, 1983
 Culture processes, 1992

References

External links 
 Homer G. Barnett papers at the University of Oregon
  Register to the Papers of Homer Barnett, National Anthropological Archives, Smithsonian Institution

1906 births
1985 deaths
People from Bisbee, Arizona
Cultural anthropologists
Ethnographers
Stanford University alumni
UC Berkeley College of Letters and Science alumni
University of Oregon faculty
Writers from Arizona
20th-century American writers
20th-century American male writers
20th-century American anthropologists